Particle board, also known as chipboard or low-density fiberboard, is an engineered wood product manufactured from wood chips and a synthetic resin or other suitable binder, which is pressed and extruded. Particle board is often confused with oriented strand board (OSB, also known as flakeboard, or waferboard), a different type of fiberboard that uses machined wood flakes and offers more strength.

Characteristics 

Particle board is cheaper, denser and more uniform than conventional wood and plywood and is substituted for them when cost is more important than strength and appearance. Particleboard can be made more appealing by painting or the use of wood veneers on visible surfaces. Though it is denser than conventional wood, it is the lightest and weakest type of fiberboard, except for insulation board. Medium-density fibreboard and hardboard, also called high-density fiberboard, are stronger and denser than particleboard. Different grades of particleboard have different densities, with higher density connoting greater strength and greater resistance to failure of screw fasteners.

A significant disadvantage of particleboard is its susceptibility to expansion and discoloration from moisture absorption, particularly when it is not covered with paint or another sealer. Therefore, it is rarely used outdoors or in places where there are high levels of moisture, except in bathrooms, kitchens and laundries, where it is commonly used as an underlayment shielded beneath a moisture resistant continuous sheet of vinyl flooring.

In dry environments, veneered particleboard is preferred over veneered plywood because of its stability, lower cost, and convenience.

History and development 
 
Particleboard originated in Germany. It was first produced in 1887, when Hubbard made so-called "artificial wood" from wood flour and an adhesive based on albumin, which was consolidated under high temperature and pressure.

During the Second World War, phenolic resin was more readily accessible than top-grade wood veneer in Germany, and Luftwaffe pilot and inventor Max Himmelheber played a role in making the first sheets of particleboard, which were little more than pourings of floor sweepings, wood chips, and ground-up off-cuts and glue. The first commercial piece was produced during the Second World War at a factory in Bremen, Germany. For its production, waste material was used, such as planer shavings, off-cuts or sawdust, hammer-milled into chips and bound together with a phenolic resin. Hammer-milling involves smashing material into smaller and smaller pieces until they can pass through a screen. Most other early particleboard manufacturers used similar processes, though often with slightly different resins.

It was found that better strength, appearance and resin economy could be achieved by using more uniform, manufactured chips. Producers began processing solid birch, beech, alder, pine and spruce into consistent chips and flakes; these finer layers were then placed on the outside of the board, with its core composed of coarser, cheaper chips. This type of board is known as three-layer particleboard.

More recently, graded-density particleboard has also evolved. It contains particles that gradually become smaller as they get closer to the surface.

Manufacturing 
Particleboard or chipboard is manufactured by mixing particles or flakes of wood or jute-stick together with a resin and forming the mixture into a sheet. The raw material is fed into a disc chipper with between four and sixteen radially arranged blades. The chips from disk chippers are more uniform in shape and size than from other types of wood chippers. The particles are then dried, and any oversize or undersized particles are screened out.

Resin is then sprayed as a fine mist onto the particles. Several types of resins are used in the procces. Amino-formaldehyde based resins are the best performing based on cost and ease of use. Urea melamine resins offer water resistance with more melamine offering higher resistance. It is typically used in external applications, with the coloured resin darkening the panel. To further enhance the panel properties, resorcinol resins can be mixed with phenolic resins, but that is more often used with marine plywood applications.

Panel production involves other chemicals including wax, dyes, wetting agents and release agents, to aid processing or make the final product resistant to water, fire or insects.

After the particles pass through a mist of resin sufficient to coat all surfaces, they are layered into a continuous carpet. This 'carpet' is then separated into discrete, rectangular 'blankets' which will be compacted in a cold press. A scale weighs the flakes, and they are distributed by rotating rakes. In graded-density particleboard, the flakes are spread by an air jet that throws finer particles further than coarse ones. Two such jets, reversed, allow the particles to build up from fine to coarse and back to fine.

The formed sheets are cold-compressed to reduce thickness and make them easier to transport. The entire process is controlled to ensure the correct size, density and consistency of the board.

The boards are then cooled, trimmed and sanded. They can then be sold as raw board or surface improved through the addition of a wood veneer or laminate surface.

Furniture design 
Particle board has had a huge influence on furniture design. In the early 1950s, particle board kitchens started to come into use in furniture construction but, in many cases, it remained more expensive than solid wood. A particle board kitchen was only available to the very wealthy. Once the technology was more developed, particle board became cheaper.

Some large companies base their strategies around providing furniture at a low price. To do this, they use the least expensive materials possible. In almost all cases, this means particle board, medium-density fibreboard (MDF), or the like. However, in order to maintain a reputation for quality at low cost, manufacturers may use higher grades of particle board, e.g., higher density particle board, thicker particle board, or particle board using higher-quality resins. One may note the amount of sag in a shelf of a given width in order to draw the distinction.

In general, the much lower cost of sheet goods (particle board, medium density fiberboard, and other engineered wood products) has helped to displace solid wood from many cabinetry applications.

Safety 
Safety concerns exist for both manufacturing and use. Fine dust and chemicals are released when particleboard is machined (e.g., sawing or routing). Occupational exposure limits exist in many countries recognizing the hazard of wood dusts. Cutting particle board can release formaldehyde, carbon monoxide, hydrogen cyanide in the case of amino resins, and phenol in the case of phenol formaldehyde resins.

The other safety concern is the slow release of formaldehyde over time. In 1984 concerns about the high indoor levels of formaldehyde in new manufactured homes led the United States Department of Housing and Urban Development to set construction standards. Particleboard (PB), medium-density fibreboard (MDF), oriented strand board (OSB), and laminated flooring have been major sources of formaldehyde emissions. In response to consumer and woodworker pressure on the industry, PB and MDF became available in "no added formaldehyde" (NAF) versions, but were not in common use . Many other building materials such as furniture finish, carpeting and caulking give off formaldehyde, as well as urea-formaldehyde foam insulation, which is banned in Canada for installation in a residential closed cavity wall. Formaldehyde is classified by the WHO as a known human carcinogen.

See also 
 Fiberboard
 Glued laminated timber
 Haskelite
 Masonite
 Pressed wood
 Waferboard

References

External links

 MDF Vs Particleboard
 European Panel Federation: Particleboard

Composite materials
Woodworking materials
Engineered wood
German inventions of the Nazi period

es:Madera#Aglomerados o conglomerados